Nainville-les-Roches is a commune in the Essonne department in Île-de-France in northern France.

Inhabitants of Nainville-les-Roches are known as Nainvillois. The historian Jean Gagé (1902–1986) was born in Nainville-les-Roches.

Geography

Climate

Nainville-les-Roches has a oceanic climate (Köppen climate classification Cfb)).

See also
Communes of the Essonne department

References

External links

Mayors of Essonne Association 

Communes of Essonne